Koken can refer to:

 Empress Kōken (713–770), Empress of Japan (749–758)
 Lagged Fibonacci generator, a pseudorandom number generator also known as a Koken generator.
 Mike Koken (1909-1962), American football coach and player